Michael Hanrahan was an American politician.

From the town of Granville, Wisconsin, Hanrahan lived in the community of Good Hope, Wisconsin. He served in the Wisconsin State Assembly, in 1858, as a Democrat.

Notes

Year of birth unknown
Year of death unknown
People from Granville, Wisconsin
Democratic Party members of the Wisconsin State Assembly